Greta Army Camp was an Australian Army camp built in 1939 near Greta, New South Wales, Australia. It was used for training soldiers of the Second Australian Imperial Force (2AIF) during World War II. The Australian army sold the site at auction in 1980.

History
In November 1939,  of land was compulsorily acquired in the Allandale-Greta area to create one of the Australian Army's largest training camps. Built for the training of the 6th Division of the 2AIF because the existing Australian army facilities were occupied by Citizens Military Force units.

The 2/11th Battalion arrived at the camp on 15 December 1939 and were later joined by the 2/10th Battalion. The camp facilities were expanded during the war, with two parts of the camp known as "Chocolate City",  due to the brown-coloured oiled timber weatherboard buildings in that part of the camp and "Silver City", due to corrugated iron Nissen huts built in that part of the camp. Citizens Military Force units were also trained at the camp, with up to 60,000 Australian soldiers trained during World War II.

After the war, much of the field training areas were returned to grazing purposes, however the camp was required for the training of troops preparing to join the occupation forces in Japan. In 1949, Greta Camp was transferred to the Department of Immigration and until 1960 it was used as a reception and training centre for European migrants with over 100,000 immigrants passing through the centre. The Army resumed control of the camp in 1962 and, after being used intermittently for training exercises. It was sold at auction by the Australian army in 1980.

Notes

External links
 Cessnock City Council
 Australian War Memorial
 Australian Travel Guide
 Maitland Mercury
 Camp Greta photo webpage

Australian Army
Military history of Australia during World War II
Military camps in Australia
Migrant hostels in Australia
Hunter Region